Erriba is a rural locality in the local government area (LGA) of Kentish in the North-west and west LGA region of Tasmania. The 2016 census recorded a population of 47 for the state suburb of Erriba.

History 
Erriba was gazetted as a locality in 1965. The name is believed to be an Aboriginal word for “cockatoo”. 

A post office of that name was opened in 1910.

Geography
The Wilmot River forms the western boundary, and the Forth River forms part of the eastern.

Road infrastructure 
Route C132 (Cradle Mountain Road) passes through from north-east to south, and then follows the southern boundary for some distance.

References

Towns in Tasmania
Localities of Kentish Council